Shead is a surname, and may refer to:

Artie Shead, New Zealand rugby league player
Brian Shead (1937–2020), Australian racing driver, constructor and administrator
Carrie Sheads, American school administrator
DeShawn Shead (born 1988), American football cornerback
Garry Shead, Australian artist and filmmaker; won the Archibald Prize in 1992/93 and the Dobell Prize in 2004
James Shead (born 1965), British auto racing driver
Phillip Shead, New Zealand and French rugby league player

See also
Shead High School, public high school in Eastport, Maine
Shea (disambiguation)
Sheard
Shed